Royce Alexander White (born April 10, 1991) is an American former professional basketball player. During his brief tenure with the NBA—he played just briefly in three regular-season games—White was open about his history of Generalized Anxiety Disorder (GAD), mainly triggered by his highly publicized fear of flying, and he became known for refusing to fly with his team, preferring to travel by bus instead.

White was the 2009 Minnesota Mr. Basketball and a two-time Minnesota State High School League (MSHSL) championship team member. He was a Class 3A MSHSL champion in 2006 with DeLaSalle High School as a freshman and a Class 4A MSHSL champion in 2009 with Hopkins High School as a senior, leading his school to a perfect (31-0) record.

White played college basketball with the Iowa State Cyclones basketball team starring for the 2011–12 Cyclones, leading his team in every major statistical category. Before that he was a high school basketball star in the state of Minnesota and had committed to play for the Minnesota Golden Gophers men's basketball team before being suspended by the team for theft and assault and transferring to Iowa State. White was called the "mystery pick" of the 2012 NBA Draft due to his NBA ready body, legal issues, point-forward skill set, and public disclosure of his severe fear of flying during his season at Iowa State. White was drafted in the first round by the Houston Rockets and is now called a "draft bust".

In 2017, after a hiatus from professional basketball, White reemerged to play his first full pro season in Canada. He was the 2017 regular season NBL Canada MVP and led the Lightning to the NBL Canada championship. He later joined the Big3 league as a semiprofessional. 

In 2022, White announced he would be running for Congress in Minnesota's 5th congressional district as a Republican. The New York Post has referred to White as "a far-right populist," who has "embraced conspiracy theories including but not limited to the integrity of the 2020 presidential election and satanic influences in the federal government." He lost in the Republican primary.

Early life 
White was born in 1991 in Minneapolis, Minnesota, the son of Kevin Tucker and Rebecca White. He is of multiracial origin, with a Mexican, Norwegian, Welsh, and African-American ancestry.

White started playing sports at the age of five in the South St. Paul, Rondo, and North Minneapolis communities. His grandfather, Frank White, has been a lifelong athletics and recreation figure.

High school career 
White went to DeLaSalle High School for his freshman to junior years. Following his sophomore season, in which he led DeLaSalle to a 19–8 record, White participated in the 2007 LeBron James US Skills Academy in Akron, Ohio and The Nike Global Challenge at the University of Portland. For his senior year, White went to Hopkins High School. After transferring to Hopkins, he won the Class 4A MSHSL Championship in 2009, giving him his second state championship. Hopkins finished 10th in the final USA Today national poll, with a 31–0 record.
He was rated as the 2nd, 8th and 10th best high school power forward in the national class of 2009 by Rivals.com, ESPN.com and Scout.com, respectively. Rivals ranked him 19th overall, while ESPN ranked him 35th.  He had dozens of collegiate scholarship offers, including Minnesota, Creighton, Illinois, Iowa, Iowa State, Michigan State, Purdue, Texas, USC, and Wisconsin. White was one of 20 2009 Jordan Brand Classic All-Americans, and he was recognized by the St. Paul Pioneer Press as a First-Team All-State honoree.

White was the 2009 Minnesota Mr. Basketball and a two-time Minnesota State High School League (MSHSL) championship team member. He was a Class 3A MSHSL champion in 2006 with DeLaSalle High School as a freshman and a Class 4A MSHSL champion in 2009 with Hopkins High School as a senior, leading his school to a perfect (31-0) record.

College career

Minnesota 
White pleaded guilty to theft and disorderly conduct in the October 13, 2009, incident at the Mall of America; he was accused of taking $100 worth of clothes and of fifth-degree assault, when he allegedly pushed a mall security officer to the ground twice, but he claimed the security officer was charging at him and he was defending himself. He was suspended for the 2009–10 NCAA Division I men's basketball season.  The suspension was for competition and travel, but at the discretion of the head coach, Tubby Smith, White could attend practices. According to his grandfather, he attended some Gopher practices in December.

White was a suspect in a November laptop theft from a university dorm, but after 3 months of investigation, the University of Minnesota police department did not have enough evidence to charge him with theft.  He was formally charged with trespassing in January.  He left the University of Minnesota in February 2010. He had unofficially announced his departure from Minnesota via YouTube in November, but had not formally notified the athletic department. Despite his legal difficulties, White achieved better than a 3.0 grade point average in his first semester at Minnesota. While suspended from the team, he spent some of his extracurricular time on his passion for music.

Following his departure from Minnesota, White initially gave up on transferring to continue playing college basketball. He was considered to be a National Basketball Association Draft first-round talent at the time. Iowa State head coach Fred Hoiberg became acquainted with White during Hoiberg's tenure on the staff of the Minnesota Timberwolves. At one point, White was expected to transfer to Kentucky. White explained that he was considering transferring but told John Calipari he was having reservations about it. White was also considering transfers to Georgetown, Baylor, and UCLA, but decided on Iowa State.

Iowa State 

Because White did not officially depart Minnesota until the middle of his second semester, he was academically ineligible to receive a scholarship from any Division I school in 2010. The National Collegiate Athletic Association (NCAA) usually requires a two semester residency for transfers. He transferred to Iowa State prior to using any of his athletic eligibility at Minnesota and applied to the NCAA for a waiver to be eligible to play during the 2010–11 NCAA Division I men's basketball season, but the NCAA denied his waiver. Iowa State appealed the decision, but their appeal was denied.

At Iowa State, White joined a team that included several transfer students. He was voted as the 2011–12 Big 12 Preseason Newcomer of the Year and then won the first Phillips 66 Big 12 Rookie of the Week award of the season following his November 12 double-double debut performance against Lehigh with 25 points and 11 rebounds. White had a double-double in his second career game as well three nights later against Drake with 21 points and 14 rebounds. Then on November 25 against Providence, he recorded 16 rebounds. On December 3, against 15th-ranked Michigan, he recorded a double-double with 22 points and 13 rebounds, as well as 4 steals.

In conference play, White posted his first triple-double on January 7 against Texas A&M with 10 points, 18 rebounds, and 10 assists plus a block and two steals. His triple-double was one of thirteen NCAA DI triple doubles during the season. It was the fourth in Cyclones history and the first in a road game. It was the twelfth in Big 12 conference history and the sixth in intraconference play. On January 9, White was recognized for a second time as Phillips 66 Big 12 Rookie of the Week for leading Iowa State to its fifth 2–0 Big 12 start ever. On January 14, White posted a double-double against tenth-ranked Kansas with 18 points and 17 rebounds. On January 24, White posted 15 points and 15 rebounds against Texas for his sixth double-double. On January 31, White scored 22 points, including the winning shot with 1.8 seconds left in a 72–70 victory over Kansas State. White's seventh double-double came on February 7 against  when he scored 15 points and added 12 rebounds. On February 22, White posted 13 points and 10 rebounds to go along with 8 assists against Texas Tech for his eighth double-double of the season. For the week of February 20–26 White averaged 11 points, 11 rebounds and 7.5 assists while shooting 57.1% from the field to earn his third Big 12 Rookie of the Week award. At the time of his third rookie of the week recognition, he was the only Big 12 player in the conference's top 5 in terms of rebounds and assists. White concluded the regular season with a double double against Baylor on March 3 when he totaled 11 points, 11 rebounds and 4 assists.

He added a 17-point, 10-rebound double double in the 2012 Big 12 men's basketball tournament in a loss to Texas. In Iowa State's opening game of the 2012 NCAA Men's Division I Basketball Tournament, White posted 15 points and 11 rebounds in a victory over Connecticut. His season concluded with a 23-point, 9-rebound, 4-assist, and 3-steal performance in a loss to Kentucky. White fouled out for the first time in his career in the game and ended the season with 11 double-doubles. White finished the season as the team leader in points, rebounds, assists, steals and blocks, making him the only player in Division I basketball to do so.

On March 4, following the 2011–12 Big 12 Conference men's basketball season, he was named the unanimous Big 12 Newcomer of the Year and was recognized as a First team All-Big 12 and a unanimous Big 12 All-Rookie Team selection by the Big 12 coaches. In addition, he was selected as Big 12 Newcomer of the Year and was recognized as a First team All-Big 12 selection by both the Associated Press and the Kansas City Star. He concluded the regular season 2nd in the Big 12 in rebounding and 5th in assists with averages of 9.2 and 5.2, respectively.  On March 1, he was named to the 30-player midseason Naismith College Player of the Year Award watchlist.  He was selected by the U.S. Basketball Writers Association to its 10-man 2011–12 Men's All-District VI (IA, MO, KS, OK, NE, ND, SD) Team. White was a first team selection to the National Association of Basketball Coaches Division I All‐District 8 team on March 14. White was named an honorable mention Associated Press All-American.

White was the only player in the nation to lead his team in the five major statistical categories: points (13.4), rebounding (9.3), assists (5.0), steals (1.1) and blocks (0.9). He was the first cyclone since Fred Hoiberg (1993–94) and second ever to lead the team in points, rebounds and assists. His final Big 12 rankings were 2nd in both rebounding and field goal percentage (53.4%) as well as 5th in assists. He ranked 34th, 36th and 57th nationally in those same statistics. His 316 rebounds and 170 assists ranked 7th and 10th all time in school history for single-season totals. His single-season rebound total was the most by a Cyclone since 1978 (Dean Uthoff, 378).

On March 21, 2012, White chose to forgo his junior and senior years at ISU to enter the 2012 NBA Draft. On that date he stated his intent to hire an agent.

Professional career

Rio Grande Valley Vipers (2012–2013) 
At the 2012 NBA Draft Combine, White measured at 6'8" and had the widest hands, of any player participating. White was drafted by the Houston Rockets on June 28, 2012, with the 16th selection. He was represented by Andrew Vye and Andy Miller of the ASM Sports as his agents.

White missed the opening of NBA camp on Monday October 1, due to a desire to have a contractual plan put in place with the Rockets and the NBA that addressed the league wide mental health policy or lack thereof. After sessions with his own long-time doctor, White requested permission to travel by bus when necessary in order to limit his flight schedule. The Rockets and White came to an agreement regarding travel, including allowing White travel by personal bus rather than flying. White missed the first week of training camp before this agreement was put in place.

A few games into the season, White had a dispute with the team regarding the inconsistency of the way mental health was being dealt with. He cited the danger of team executives being able to make decisions regarding mental health and health with no mental health training.  This led to his absence from the team. These events coincided with the Rockets' plan to assign White to their NBA Development League affiliate, Rio Grande Valley Vipers, along with two other young players. By the end of the week, the situation remained unresolved. Two weeks after the situation began, the Rockets were optimistic. As of December 26, he had not shown up to work with the Rockets, according to head coach Kevin McHale. On December 29, Houston assigned White to its D-League affiliate Rio Grande Valley Vipers. On December 30, White again refused assignment to the Vipers.

In a January 2013 interview, White stated "chances are very high" he would never play an NBA game, blaming what he believed to be a league-wide "lack of protocol" on mental health issues. He further stated he did not hold blame against the Rockets' organization and that he still wanted to play for Houston. On January 6, 2013, the Rockets suspended White without pay for failing to perform his contract.

On January 26, 2013, the Rockets and White mutually agreed that he would report to the Rio Grande Valley Vipers on February 11, 2013. On February 8, White passed his physical. On February 12, after four months of contractual dispute, White made his professional debut with the Vipers in a 139–122 win against the Maine Red Claws, playing 18 minutes and leading the team with 8 rebounds from off the bench. White also scored 7 points and totaled 4 assists.

Following the reconciliation, a USA Today story detailed White's situation. Although White endured 20 flights for travel during his season at Iowa State, the Rockets' NBA schedule called for 98 flights. White had attempted to cope with travel in college through use of Benadryl and Xanax, but found both reduced his energy level, although it never showed in his statistical output. White cited that his concern for the increased number of flights and long term use of these types of medication could lead to dependence and addiction (which is common concern and a point of consensus concern regarding benzodiazepines in the medical community. White likened mental health conditions to a day-to-day physical injury in which symptoms can be dynamic and unclear, but support and policy should be adequately proactive).

On March 21, White announced via Twitter that following professional medical advice of team doctors along with his doctors, he would no longer be playing for the Vipers.  White claimed "there were things that needed to be addressed and now is a good time." After missing three road games to Indiana and Pennsylvania, White returned to the Vipers for their final six games, which were all home games, but he did not anticipate participating in the "hectic" playoff schedule.

When the Vipers began the playoffs on the road against the Maine Red Claws on April 11, White did not travel with the team. The Vipers went on to sweep all three playoff series and win the 2013 championship, but White did not play with the team. Over the course of the season, White traveled using a bus provided by the Rockets for 15 road games.

Sacramento Kings (2014) 
On July 3, 2013, the Rockets omitted White's name from its Orlando Summer League roster. On July 13, White and the rights to Furkan Aldemir were traded to the Philadelphia 76ers for future considerations, which helped Houston clear $1.7 million of salary cap space to help sign Dwight Howard. White participated in voluntary offseason workouts with the team and was expected to participate in training camp when it began on September 28. On September 27, at media day, White stated that he planned to travel with the team when necessary (even on its pre-season trip to Spain). However, White did not make the October 4 trip with the team to Spain. According to 76ers coach Brett Brown, "It really was just based on our team doctor giving me and [general manager] Sam [Hinkie] and the club advice that it may be best for him to remain at home." On October 25, 2013, White was waived by the 76ers. By mid-December, White was living in Chadds Ford Township, Pennsylvania with his wife and children aged 2.5 years and 6 months and had switched agents from Andrew Vye of ASM Sports to George Bass of AAI Sports.

On March 6, 2014, White signed a 10-day contract with the Sacramento Kings, but was immediately assigned to the Reno Bighorns of the NBA D-League. He made his debut for the Bighorns the next day in a 112-86 win over the Idaho Stampede. In 26 minutes of playing time, he recorded 5 points, 4 rebounds, 2 assists and 2 steals. On March 14, 2014, he was recalled by the Kings. On March 18, he signed a second 10-day contract with the Kings. On March 21, White made his NBA debut by playing 56 seconds for the Sacramento Kings, a game in which he recorded no statistics. He missed his only field-goal attempt in one minute of action in the Kings' 99–79 loss to the San Antonio Spurs but otherwise recorded no statistics. White's final NBA appearance came on March 26, 2014, in a 107-99 loss to the New York Knicks.  Royce committed two fouls in seven minutes of action, but otherwise accumulated no statistics. After White's second 10-day contract expired, the Kings decided to part ways with him.

London Lightning (2016–2018) 
In March 2015, White said he continued to aspire to play professional basketball. He became a 2015 NBA Summer League target for several teams and later joined the Los Angeles Clippers to play in the Orlando Summer League.

On December 8, 2016, White signed with the London Lightning of the NBL Canada. During the season, he set a league record for triple-doubles with 4 (plus one in the playoffs). On May 11, 2017, he was named the 2017 NBL Canada regular season league MVP. On June 5, White posted 34 points, 15 rebounds and 9 assists to lead the Lightning to their 3rd NBL Canada Championship since the league was formed in 2011.

On July 28, 2017, White re-signed with the London Lightning for the 2017–18 season. He led the league in scoring with 25.4 points per game. On April 27, 2018, White received an 11-game suspension during the 2018 playoffs for a verbal outburst with an official and the deputy commissioner of the league, effectively ending his season. White was named to the First Team All-NBLC. After the end of the season, the London Lightning announced that White would not be returning to the team.

On July 12, 2018, White signed a deal with Auxilium Torino of the Italian LBA and the EuroCup Basketball. However, he did not report for training camp and his contract was officially voided on August 23, 2018.

Enemies (2019) 
In May 2019, Royce White was the first overall pick in the Big3 2019 draft.

He was ejected from his first game in the league on June 22 following a fight with Josh Smith.

Power (2021–present) 
In 2021, White joined Power and participated in the 8 weeks of play that the team competed in as part of the BIG3 League.

Post-basketball career 
In early 2019, White released a book, MMA x NBA, A Critique of Modern Sport in America, and announced that he was transitioning into mixed martial arts.

He has four children.

Political career 
White led several protests in the wake of the murder of George Floyd.

On July 10, 2021, White received media attention for his protest against the Uyghur genocide during a Big3 postgame interview. Commentators contrasted his statements with stances taken by the NBA.

On February 22, 2022, White announced he would run for the Republican nomination for the United States House of Representatives in Minnesota's 5th congressional district, which is currently represented by Ilhan Omar. His campaign was endorsed by former President Donald Trump's advisor, Steve Bannon, and he appeared on the radio show of Alex Jones. White lost the Republican primary to Cicely Davis. The New York Post referred to White as "a far-right populist," who has "embraced conspiracy theories ranging from the origins of the coronavirus to the integrity of the 2020 presidential election and satanic influences in the federal government." White has referred to the Federal Reserve as a "corporate merged power – of globalist power, of financial tyranny" and has criticized the "pervasive effect" of the LGBTQ community on society.

Following the October 28, 2022 attack on Paul Pelosi, husband of Nancy Pelosi (speaker of the House) White promoted the homophobic conspiracy theory that the attack was the result of  Paul Pelosi's involvement in an extramarital gay affair.

Career statistics

NBA 

|-
| style="text-align:left;"| 
| style="text-align:left;"| Sacramento
| 3 || 0 || 3.0 || .000 || – || – || .0 || .0 || .0 || .0 || .0

College 

|-
| style="text-align:left;"|2011–12
| style="text-align:left;"|Iowa State
| 34 || 33 || 31.5 || .534 || .333 || .498 || 9.3 || 5.0 || 1.2 || 0.9 || 13.4
|}

Mixed martial arts career

Professional career 
After two years of training mixed martial arts, White made his professional mixed martial arts debut against Daiqwon Buckley at LFA 120 on December 10, 2021. He lost the bout via unanimous decision.

Mixed martial arts record 

|-
| Loss
| align=center|0–1
| Daiqwon Buckley
| Decision (unanimous)
| LFA 120
| 
| align=center|3
| align=center|5:00
| Prior Lake, Minnesota, United States
|
|}

References

External links 

 
 Iowa State Cyclones bio

1991 births
Living people
21st-century African-American sportspeople
African-American basketball players
African-American Catholics
African-American mixed martial artists
American expatriate basketball people in Canada
American expatriate basketball people in Italy
American men's basketball players
Auxilium Pallacanestro Torino players
Basketball players from Minneapolis
Big3 players
Candidates in the 2022 United States House of Representatives elections
DeLaSalle High School (Minneapolis) alumni
Hopkins High School alumni
Houston Rockets draft picks
Iowa State Cyclones men's basketball players
Lega Basket Serie A players
London Lightning players
Minnesota Golden Gophers men's basketball players
Power forwards (basketball)
Reno Bighorns players
Rio Grande Valley Vipers players
Sacramento Kings players
American men's 3x3 basketball players
American male mixed martial artists
Minnesota Republicans